Hilario D. "Larry" Ramos Jr. (April 19, 1942 – April 30, 2014) was an American guitarist, banjo player and vocalist known primarily for his work with the 1960s pop band the Association. In 1963, he won a Grammy Award with the New Christy Minstrels.

Early years
Ramos was of Filipino descent with a blend of Chinese and Spanish. He was born to father Larry Ramos Sr., who operated pool halls in Honolulu, Kakaako and Kalaheo, and mother Pat Ramos. He was raised in Waimea, Kauai County, Hawaii. 

Ramos' father taught him how to play the ukulele, beginning with "My Bonnie Lies over the Ocean" at the age of four. Ramos recalled practicing on the floor of the hotel gift shop where his mother worked and sleeping with the instrument so that he could play upon wakening. He won a local music contest with his sister at the age of five, and when he was seven, Ramos played ukulele on The Arthur Godfrey Show after winning a statewide ukulele contest organized by Godfrey. He played ukulele and sang in the 1950 musical romance film Pagan Love Song, starring Esther Williams, after Arthur Freed had heard him playing the song in his mother's hotel gift shop. However, Ramos' part singing "The House of Singing Bamboo" was cut in the final edit to shorten the film's running time.

In the early 1950s, the family moved to Bell, California. At 13, Ramos performed in the national tour of the Richard Rodgers and Oscar Hammerstein II musical The King and I as understudy (to Patrick Adiarte) in the role of the crown prince of Thailand opposite Yul Brynner. He performed the lead role with Leonard Graves and Patricia Morison in 1955 (while the film was being produced) at the Royal Alexandra Theatre in Toronto. Concerned that her son's education was inadequate, Ramos' mother withdrew him from the tour after a year, and he attended Bell High School before majoring in political science at East Los Angeles College and Cerritos College.

Career

The New Christy Minstrels
Ramos joined the New Christy Minstrels, an American folk music band, in 1962. The group served as a backup band on The Andy Williams Show. At the audition, he noted that he was "the only brown kid in the group" and he did not hear back from them for several weeks. When they eventually called him, they informed him that the delay was caused by the show's producers because he would be the only non-white member of the band. Ramos settled into a role providing vocals and playing banjo as well as other stringed instruments. He was noted as being "one of the more popular ones" as he "stood out like a sore thumb."

The Association recorded their 1962 debut album Presenting the New Christy Minstrels, which subsequently won a 1963 Grammy Award for Best Performance by a Chorus, making Ramos the first Asian-American to win the award.

Ramos toured almost every day for three years after joining the band. While on tour, he met and married his wife, who was originally from Grangeville, Idaho, in Reno, Nevada. After the birth of his twin daughters, he did not see his family again for six months, prompting him to quit the band in January 1966 because he "wanted to watch his children grow up." The band's producers vowed that he would never work in music again.

The Association
After quitting the New Christy Minstrels, Ramos worked as a studio musician and backup singer, releasing a solo single in 1966, "It'll Take a Little Time" (later collected in the 2002 album Anthology: Just The Right Sound by the Association).

In 1967, a member of the Association asked Ramos to join the band because their lead guitarist, Jules Alexander, was planning to leave the band for a spiritual pilgrimage to India. According to Ramos, he attended an Association concert in the San Francisco Bay Area to get a feel for their music, but after bass player Brian Cole injured his fingers in a firecracker accident, Alexander asked Ramos to take the stage as the lead guitarist with only a few hours of notice. Ramos learned the chords after listening to the band's two albums for two hours.

Later that year, Ramos performed with the band at the 1967 Monterey Pop Festival. While he was with the Association, he recorded five studio albums and several singles. Most notably, Ramos contributed lead vocals for the hit singles "Windy" (along with Russ Giguere) and "Never My Love" (along with Terry Kirkman) for the Association's first studio album with Ramos, the gold-selling Insight Out.

Ramos left the Association in 1975 over differences regarding the band’s future musical direction, but he reunited with the surviving members in 1979. In 1984, Ramos and Giguere acquired the rights to the band's name and Ramos was considered its leader.

On February 24, 2014, Ramos made his final performance with the band, two sold-out shows at the Blue Fox Theatre in Grangeville, Idaho with proceeds to benefit a local Relay For Life.

After Ramos' death, his vocal parts were taken by Paul Holland.

Illness and death
Ramos, a longtime resident of Grangeville, Idaho since the 1980s, suffered numerous ailments over his last few years. On August 31, 2011, he suffered a heart attack. In 2013, he was diagnosed with metastatic melanoma. He died at a hospital in Clarkston, Washington on April 30, 2014 at the age of 72.

References

External links
 
 
  Ramos sings a verse as "Charlie Row the Junk Ashore" in Chinglish/Engrish at 2:20
 
 
 

1942 births
2014 deaths
20th-century American male musicians
20th-century American guitarists
American banjoists
American musicians of Filipino descent
American rock guitarists
American male guitarists
American male pop singers
Guitarists from Hawaii
People from Grangeville, Idaho
People from Kauai County, Hawaii
Deaths from melanoma
Deaths from cancer in Washington (state)
The New Christy Minstrels members
The Association members